Zăbala may refer to the following places in Romania:

 Zăbala, a commune in Covasna County
 Zăbala (Putna), a tributary of the Putna in Vrancea County
 Zăbala (Râul Negru), a tributary of the Râul Negru in Covasna County